Huta Stalowa Wola (HSW SA) is a defense contractor that operates a steel mill in the city of Stalowa Wola, Poland. It is a major producer of military equipment and one of the largest heavy construction machinery producers in East-Central Europe.

In 1981 HSW and International Harvester constructed the  TD-40 earth mover, the world's largest at that time. It had plough capacity 19 m3 and the engine had 460hp. Production began in 1983. TD-40 was used by State Polish mines and was exported to USA, Czechoslovakia, and the Soviet Union. TD-40E variant is still produced under the "Dressta" name. 

HSW SA is part of Polska Grupa Zbrojeniowa SA.

History
It was established in 1938 in the Second Polish Republic. It was a part of a series of investments made by the Polish government from 1936–1939 to create the Central Industrial Region. This was to be a group of factories built in the middle of the country, away from the borders with Germany and the USSR. It was designed to provide a reasonably secure location for the production of armaments and high technology goods.

The mill manufactured high alloy steels and weapons artillery and heavy machine guns in 1937. A city grew around the mill, and took its name from the town of Stalowa Wola.

In the 1960s and 1970s the company started production of heavy construction machinery, and in the 1980s, it was one of the major centers of resistance to the governemnt (see 1988 Polish strikes). In 1991 Huta Stalowa Wola became a joint stock company.

It is the town's major employer.

On 1 February 2012, HSW SA sold its civilian construction machinery division to Guangxi Liugong Machinery.

In 2012, HSW bought Jelcz-Komponenty Sp. z OO.

Shareholders
 Polska Grupa Zbrojeniowa S.A. 85.09%
 The State Treasury 4.15%
 PGE Obrót S.A. 1.08%
 Adamczyk Grzegorz 1.02%
 PGNiG S.A. 0.81%

References

External links

 
 LiuGong Poland, formerly part of HSW

Iron and steel mills in Poland
Defence companies of Poland
Government-owned companies of Poland
2012 mergers and acquisitions
Polish brands
 Category:Companies established in 1938]]